The Law of 14 Frimaire was passed on 4 December 1793, during the French Revolution, in which power became centralized and consolidated under the Committee of Public Safety. It stopped representatives on-mission from taking 'action' without the authority of the committee. The Law of 14 Frimaire established the Bulletin des lois which existed until 1929 as the venue in which French laws were formally published. Counterfeiting the Bulletin des Lois was punishable by death.

Jacques-Nicolas Billaud-Varenne proposed the law as a means to rigorously centralize power in the National Convention and its Committee of Public Safety. This was an attempt to bring order to the Reign of Terror and make the representatives more accountable.

References

1793 events of the French Revolution
Frimaire
Law of France